Ligulalepis is an extinct genus of prehistoric bony fish. Ligulalepis was first described from isolated scales found in the Taemas-Wee jasper limestones of New South Wales (Early Devonian age) by Dr Hans-Peter Schultze (1968) and further material described by Burrow (1994). A nearly complete skull found in the same general location was described in Nature by Basden et al. (2000) claiming the genus was closely related to basal ray-finned fishes (Actinopterygii). In 2015 Flinders University student Benedict King found a more complete new skull of this genus which was formally described by Clement et al. (2018), showing the fish to be on the stem of all osteichthyans.

See also

 Prehistoric fish
 List of prehistoric bony fish

References 

Prehistoric bony fish genera